Raymond Dean Astumian is an American physical chemist.

Astumian earned a bachelor's degree, followed by a master's degree in chemistry from the University of Texas at Arlington in 1978 and 1982. He obtained a doctorate in mathematical science and physical chemistry from the same institution the next year. Astumian is a professor at the University of Maine. In 2000, he was elected a fellow of the American Physical Society "[f]or fundamental contributions to understanding the thermodynamics and mechanism of transduction of energy from a non-equilibrium chemical reaction to drive directed transport by molecular motors and pumps." Astumian won the 2011 Feynman Prize for Theory.

References

University of Texas at Austin alumni
Fellows of the American Physical Society
University of Maine faculty
Living people
20th-century American physicists
21st-century American physicists
Year of birth missing (living people)
American physical chemists
20th-century American chemists
21st-century American chemists